Doug Lazy Gettin' Crazy is the only album by the American hip hop musician Doug Lazy, released in 1990.

"Let the Rhythm Pump", "H.O.U.S.E.", and "Let It Roll" reached No. 1 on the Billboard Dance Club Songs chart. The album peaked at No. 65 on the UK Albums Chart.

Production
The album was written and produced by Doug Lazy. It was made using just an Alesis MMT-8 sequencer and a Roland W-30.

Critical reception

Trouser Press wrote that "deep-bottom hip-house tracks—which owe something to the capital city’s go-go scene—have plenty of get-up-and-groove, as does ol’ Doug, once he gets up to the mic and commences to rhyming." The Washington Post deemed the album "10 relentless pumpers." Newsday declared that Lazy "combines furious house beats with simple, propulsive chants to create a landmark of hip house." Comparing Lazy to Kool Moe Dee and M.C. Hammer, the Indianapolis Recorder wrote that "the club music makes his sound stand alone."

AllMusic called Doug Lazy Gettin' Crazy  "a decent party album that has its share of catchy and infectious grooves." The Rolling Stone Album Guide wrote that Lazy's "approach to rhythm neatly blends hip-hop's raucous dynamism with the repetitious pulse of house music."

Track listing

References

1990 albums
Atlantic Records albums